Kota Harinarayana (born 1943 in Brahmapur, Odisha) is an aviation engineer. He was born in Brahmapur . He was appointed as chairman of the board of governors of IIT (BHU), Varanasi by Hon'ble President of India on 25 August 2020 for three years. He was the vice-chancellor of the University of Hyderabad and the president of the Aeronautical Society of India.

He completed his schooling from City High School, Brahmapur. He obtained his bachelor's degree in mechanical engineering from Indian Institute of Technology (BHU) Varanasi in 1964, and received master's degree in Aerospace Engineering from Indian Institute of Science. He got his Ph.D from IIT Bombay. He also holds a bachelor's degree in law.

He was programme director and chief designer of India's Light Combat Aircraft (LCA) Tejas Programme.

Awards and honours
 Distinguished Scientist Award, Defence Research Development Organization, India
 Padma Shri, 2002

References

External links
http://www.pmibangalorechapter.org/pmpc2006/speakers/kotaharinarayana_profile.html
https://www.webcitation.org/64h0bg9HO?url=http://drdo.gov.in/drdo/pub/nl/may02/padmashri.htm

1943 births
Living people
People from Odisha
IIT Bombay alumni
Recipients of the Padma Shri in science & engineering
Indian Institute of Science alumni
Banaras Hindu University alumni
Indian Institute of Technology (BHU) Varanasi alumni
Telugu people